Perrier's sifaka (Propithecus perrieri) is a lemur endemic to Madagascar. It was formerly considered to be a subspecies of diademed sifaka
It has a very small range in northeastern Madagascar where its habitat is dry deciduous or semihumid forest. Part of its range is in protected areas. Females are slightly larger than males.

It moves in small family groups through the canopy feeding on fruit, leaves, flowers, buds, and seeds. Groups have territories around one hectare and vocalise with each other. The main threats faced by this sifaka are habitat destruction and fragmentation due to slash-and-burn agriculture, charcoal gathering, and logging. The International Union for Conservation of Nature has rated its conservation status as "critically endangered".

Description
It has a length of 85 to 92 cm, of which 42–46 cm are tail. Its pelage is almost entirely black, covering everywhere on its body except for the face and ears. It has small, forward-facing eyes. The species has masses ranging from 3.7 to 6.0 kg. Minimal sexual dimorphism is seen, but females are slightly larger in weight on average.

Distribution
Perrier's sifaka has a very limited range in northeastern Madagascar between the Irodo River to the north and the Lokia River to the south.  The species' geographic range is concentrated on the Analamerana Special Reserve managed by Madagascar National Parks and in the Andrafiamena Protected Area managed by the NGO Fanamby. Its presence in the Ankarana National Park has been reported a few decades ago, but could not be confirmed in the last decade.

Its habitat consists of dry deciduous and semihumid forest. 
Groups of this species have a home range around a hectare.

Past distribution
The hypothesis that northern sifaka species had their distribution contract is supported by phylogeographic, genetic, and fossil data. In contrast to the other sifaka species, P. tattersalli and P. perrieri have a disjunct and restricted distribution in the northern
part of Madagascar, far removed from the northern limit of their sister species. (Supplementary figure 1 in Salmona et al. 2017) In addition, bones attributed to P. cf. verreauxi (i.e. western sifaka) and P. cf diadema (i.e. eastern sifaka) were found in Ankarana (Figure 1 in Salmona et al., 2017, Jungers et al. 1995) and bones of P. cf diadema were reported at Andavakoera (Montagne des Français, Figure 1 in Salmona et al., 2017; Godfrey et al. 1996). Although these sifaka subfossils were not radiocarbon dated, they suggest that the paleodistributions of both sifaka species were much wider than today and possibly overlapping.

Demographic History
Using population genetic analyses, Salmona et al. 2017 inferred the demographic history of P.perrieri. Their analyses show that P. perrieri underwent a major demographic decline, which most likely occurred after the mid-Holocene transition (in the last 5,000 years). While mid-Holocene climate change probably triggered major demographic changes in northern lemur species range and connectivity, human settlements that expanded over the last four millennia in northern Madagascar likely played a role in the loss and fragmentation of the forest cover.

Diet
The diet of Perrier's sifaka resembles that of other sifakas, consisting of fruit, leaves, flowers, buds, petioles, and
seeds. Sifakas are naturally suited for this herbivorous diet because they have long gastrointestinal tracts and enlarged ceca. Groups of sifaka do not show any aggression towards other groups when feeding, let alone come into contact with each other.
Sifakas in general show seasonal variation in diet. During the wet season, Perrier's sifakas contribute most of their feeding time, about 70 to 90%, to fruits and seeds, but in the dry season, most of the species' feeding time is spent on leaves and flowers.

Behavior

Perrier's sifakas use vocalizations to communicate including warning calls and have even been observed to make a sound described as sneezing.

Social Structure
Sifakas have groups of two to six individuals. Dispersal of sex is unbiased, which is uncommon among most species. Aggression between groups is extremely low, as is the overall encounter rates between groups. Society is largely matriarchal and females have feeding priority. Mating habits have not been thoroughly studied yet.

Lifecycle
The reproductive cycle is bound to the season and sifakas reproduce either every year or every two years. Infants have a slow growth rate given the large abundance of food on Madagascar, but dental development is just the opposite. A hypothesis has been put forth that this is to reduce the dependency period of the offspring and increase the chance of survival for the mother, which does not have to expend energy and time to raise her offspring. Most females do not place much effort into individual offspring, as half of sifaka infants die before the age of one. Infants become independent at the age of two and reach sexual maturity at the age of four for females and five for males. Males use genital swelling to communicate that they are ready for sex.

Conservation status
Perrier's sifaka is one of the most endangered primates due to the limited distribution and low population density. It is listed in CITES Appendix I. A recent conservation plan for Perrier's sifaka has been developed following the International Union for Conservation 
of Nature  Species Survival Commission (SSC) Lemur Red List reassessment meeting in Antananarivo in 2012. While selective logging still seems to be one of the main threads in Analamerana special reserve, deforestation for slash and burn agriculture and for charcoal production is predominant in Andrafiamena-Andavakoera protected area. Given the small total population size, persistence of local threats, and the paucity of wildlife patrols, an appraisal of its population levels and an effective control of habitat loss are urgently needed. This requires a unified regional management plan, since the species’ natural range and potential areas of migration/seasonal presence overlap with three areas of different protective status, independently managed by Madagascar National Parks (Analamerana and Ankarana) and Fanamby (Andrafiamena). Given the diverse group of stakeholders involved (e.g. park services, ministries, universities, tour operators, local businesses, farmers, etc.), P. perrieri conservation requires a clearly defined institution, committed to leading its conservation plan with incentives for inclusive action that take advantage of the strengths of the different participants .

References

External links

 Perrier's sifaka habitat near Anjahankely in the Andrafiamena-Andavakoera Protected Area
 Primate Info Net Eastern Sifakas Factsheet

Sifakas
Endemic fauna of Madagascar
Mammals of Madagascar
Critically endangered fauna of Africa
Mammals described in 1931
Taxa named by Louis Lavauden